This list of philatelic awards is an index to articles describing notable awards for philately. The list shows the country of the sponsor(s) of each award, but recipients are not necessarily limited to people from that country.

See also
 Lists of awards

References

 
Philatelic